Olivier Backes (born 26 April 1973) is a French sailor. He competed in the Tornado event at the 2004 Summer Olympics.

References

External links
 

1973 births
Living people
French male sailors (sport)
Olympic sailors of France
Sailors at the 2004 Summer Olympics – Tornado
People from Saint-Cyr-l'École
21st-century French people